Bad Schussenried (Swabian: Schussariad) is a spa town in Upper Swabia in the district of Biberach, Baden-Württemberg, Germany.

It lies on the Upper Swabian Baroque Route and the Swabian Spa Route.
Schussenried Abbey, a former monastery founded in 1183, is located in Bad Schussenried. Its church and Baroque library feature impressive architecture and artwork, including intricate ceiling frescoes.

The town is also home to a beer stein museum, the Schussenrieder Bierkrug Museum.

Bad Schussenried had a population of 8,537 at the end of 2015.

Geography
Bad Schussenried is located between Ulm and Lake Constance on the river Schussen. The 48th parallel north runs through Bad Schussenried.

History
Archaeological finds provided evidence of a prehistoric settlement in the region. In 1866, a Paleolithic campsite of hunters and gatherers was discovered. These were the first Paleolithic finds in Central Europe.

World heritage site
At Aichbühl, about 1.5 km north of the Schussen source, excavations at the end of the 19th century in the bog of Federsee discovered Neolithic pile-dwelling (or stilt house) settlements that are part of the Prehistoric Pile dwellings around the Alps UNESCO World Heritage Site.

Middle Ages
Shuozenried was first mentioned in records in 1153. The history of the city is closely linked to that of Schussenried Abbey. In 1183, the local lords Konrad and Beringer founded the Premonstratensians monastery. The abbey received many privileges, for example in 1521 the High Jurisdiction (blood court), allowing it to depict the sword next to the crozier in the coat of arms. Until the secularization, the canons governed the monastic community.

Culture and Attractions

Museums
 Bierkrugmuseum is a museum about beer steins
 Oberschwäbisches Museumsdorf Kürnbach is an Upper Swabian village with 31 buildings and furnishings from six centuries
 Pilgrimage museum Alte Schmiede at Steinhausen
 Ailinger Erlebnismühle with an over 400 years old tradition in the district Reichenbach
 Museum of coaches
 Zentrales württembergisches Mundartarchiv und Museum
 Monastery museum Klostermuseum Bad Schussenried

Buildings

 Schussenried Abbey
 , 1728–1731
 Church St. Oswald at district Otterswang, 1770
 Church Kirche zu den Heiligen Sebastian at district Reichenbach, 1460
 Castles: Burg Hervetsweiler, Burg Kürnbach, Ruine Otterswang, Burg Reichenbach, Burg Rudersberg, Burg Schussenried

Economy and Infrastructure
Until the middle of the 20th century, peat extraction was an important industry in Schussenried. Today major local employers are a psychiatric hospital for general psychiatry and psychotherapy (ZfP Südwürttemberg), the Schwäbische Hüttenwerke (SHW), an automotive supplier, and the concrete mixer division of the Liebherr Group.

Transport
The station Bad Schussenried is located on the Southern Railway (Württemberg). Trains run every hour to Ulm and Friedrichshafen.

Education
Bad Schussenried has a primary school, a Werkrealschule, a Realschule and a Progymnasium. In addition, the Humboldt-Institut for German as a foreign language runs a boarding school for international students.

Personality 
Oswald Metzger, a former Green party, now Christian democratic politician and cyclist Rolf Gölz, who won a silver medal in the 1984 Summer Olympics, are from Bad Schussenried. The world champion women trick cyclists are also from Bad Schussenried.

Sons and daughters of the town 

 Johann Baptist Allgaier (1763–1823), chess player
 Rolf Gölz (born 1962), professional cyclist and, sporting director of racing team Gerolsteiner

Personalities who have worked locally 

 Conradin Kreutzer (1780–1849), composer and band leader, visited the monastery school in Schussenried

References

External links
 
Zentren für Psychiatrie (Centers for psychiatry) 

Biberach (district)
Spa towns in Germany
Württemberg